K. L. N. Prasad (1928-1987) was an Indian politician. He was a Member of Parliament representing Andhra Pradesh in the Rajya Sabha the upper house of India's Parliament as member of the Indian National Congress.

References

1928 births
1987 deaths
Rajya Sabha members from Andhra Pradesh
Indian National Congress politicians
Indian mass media owners